Stakliškės is a village in Lithuania, located east of Prienai, in Prienai district of Kaunas County on the Prienai-Trakai road. Stakliškės is a center of Stakliškės elderate. The famous type of Lithuanian mead, an alcoholic beverage distilled from grain, honey and water is produced in Stakliškės. According to the 2011 census, the village had 747 residents.

History 

The place has been known since the end of the 14th century (in 1375 it was mentioned in the Teutonic Knights Chronicles as Staghelisken, in 1385 as Stakelisken). Since 1513 it was a town, and in 1586 the first church was built.

After reforms of the Great Sejm, on 16 January 1792 the monarch Stanisław August Poniatowski granted the town Magdeburg Rights. At the time the city was awarded a Coat of Arms.

The current coat of arms was granted by Presidential decree on 18 December 1997.

External links 

   History at official eldership page

References

Villages in Kaunas County